The Fraternity Leadership Association (FLA) was an association of six fraternities that was created in 2002 as an alternative to the North American Interfraternity Conference.

History
In 2002, core ideological differences caused disenchantment with the strategic direction assumed by NIC. Not agreeing with the goals and path taken by NIC during the previous 6 years and believing that the conference had been placing too much emphasis on individual undergraduates through specific programs such as leadership conferences rather than focusing on the fraternity movement as a whole, three fraternities (Kappa Sigma, Phi Delta Theta and Phi Sigma Kappa) decided to leave NIC, and there was an attempt to create a parallel National fraternity council that would better serve their needs. After a vote, four additional fraternities (Delta Kappa Epsilon, Sigma Alpha Epsilon, Sigma Lambda Beta, and Sigma Pi) decided to join such council, although keeping dual membership along with theirs in NIC. It was then when the Fraternity Leadership Association was born. Phi Delta Theta decided not to join this new council, which membership counted six fraternities. After several years, Phi Sigma Kappa decided to rejoin NIC. Thus, out the six members in FLA, only Kappa Sigma remained without dual membership. Eventually, FLA dissolved, and Kappa Sigma has not since rejoined NIC.

Member List
Delta Kappa Epsilon
Kappa Sigma
Phi Sigma Kappa
Sigma Alpha Epsilon
Sigma Lambda Beta
Sigma Pi

References

 
Student societies in the United States
Supraorganizations
Greek letter umbrella organizations
2002 establishments in the United States
Defunct fraternities and sororities